Tennur is a business locality in the city of Tiruchirappalli in Tamil Nadu, India. It is situated close to the Mahatma Gandhi market and forms a part of the Abhishekapuram zone of the Tiruchirappalli Municipal Corporation. The Tiruchirappalli branch of the Dakshin Bharat Hindi Prachar Sabha is located here.

Neighbourhoods and suburbs of Tiruchirappalli